Korčula is a town on the east coast of the island of Korčula, in Croatia, in the Adriatic.

Population
The City of Korčula has a total population of 5,634, in the following individual settlements: 
 Čara, population 616
 Korčula, population 2,856
 Pupnat, population 391
 Račišće, population 432
 Žrnovo  population 1,368

Construction
The old city is surrounded by walls, and the streets are arranged in a herringbone pattern allowing free circulation of air but protecting against strong winds. Korčula is tightly built on a promontory that guards the narrow sound between the island and the mainland. Building outside the walls was forbidden until the 18th century, and the wooden drawbridge was only replaced in 1863. All of Korčula's narrow streets are stepped with the notable exception of the street running alongside the southeastern wall. The street is called the Street of Thoughts as one did not have to worry about the steps.

Historic sites
The town's historic sites include the central Romanesque-Gothic Cathedral of St Mark (built from 1301 to 1806), the 15th-century Franciscan monastery with a Venetian Gothic cloister, the civic council chambers, the palace of the former Venetian governors, grand 15th- and 16th-century palaces of the local merchant nobles, and the massive city fortifications.

Cursola, as it was called in Latin, became an episcopal see in the early 14th century, when the bishop of Ston (Stagnum in Latin)  asked to be authorized to transfer his seat there because of Serb pressure on Ston. This was granted and he was made bishop also of a new diocese of Cursola united with his previous one. In 1541, the Ragusans asked for the separation of ecclesiastical jurisdiction over Ston, which they had conquered, from Cursola, which in the previous century had become a Venetian possession. In 1828, when both the Korčula and Ragusa (Dubrovnik) belonged to the Austrian Empire, the territory of the diocese of Cursola was made part of that of Dubrovnik. No longer a residential bishopric, Cursola is today listed by the Catholic Church as a titular see.

Culture
The devout Catholic inhabitants of Korčula keep alive old folk church ceremonies and a weapon dance, the Moreška, which dates back to the Middle Ages. Originally danced only on special occasions, in modern times there are performances twice a week for tourists.

The city's Town Statute dating back to 1214 prohibited slavery.

Gallery

References

External links 
 Korculainfo.com
 The official web site of Korčula

Korčula
Cities and towns in Croatia
Populated places in Dubrovnik-Neretva County
Kingdom of Dalmatia
Populated coastal places in Croatia
City walls in Croatia